Ashireh may refer to:
 Ashireh-ye Khalaf
 Ashireh-ye Qazban
 Ashireh-ye Seyyed Jaber
 Ashireh-ye Seyyed Majid